Joseph Zentmayer (March 27, 1826 — March 28, 1888) was a German-American maker of microscopes and other optical instruments.

After graduating from the gymnasium in Mannheim, he was apprenticed to a local optician. After completing his apprenticeship, he associated himself with optical establishments in Karlsruhe, Frankfort, Munich, and Hamburg. Because of his pro-democracy support of the 1848 Revolution, he immigrated to the United States when he was about twenty-two years old. After working for wages in optical workshops in Baltimore and Philadelphia, Zentmayer started in 1858 his own shop in Philadelphia at the corner of Eighth Street and Chestnut Street. During the American Civil War, he provided most of the microscopes used in the U.S. government hospitals. He was appointed a member of the Iowa Total Eclipse Expedition in 1869 and contributed to the success of the expedition by his work on the photographic apparatus.

The Centennial Model is on display at the Delaware County Institute of Science in Media, Pennsylvania.

He was elected as a member to the American Philosophical Society in 1873. In 1875 Zentmayer was awarded the Elliott Cresson Medal of the Franklin Institute. In 1876 in Philadelphia, the United States Centennial Commission awarded him a bronze medal. In 1878 the Committee of Awards on Microscopes of the Paris Exhibition awarded him a silver medal and a diploma.

References

External links

An example of Zentmayer’s American Centennial model microscope
An example of Zentmayer’s Grand American model microscope
Examples of Zentmayer’s United States Army Hospital Model Microscopes

1826 births
1888 deaths
German-American Forty-Eighters
Engineers from Mannheim
Microscopists
American scientific instrument makers